The 1953 Argentine Grand Prix was race 1 of 9 in the 1953 World Championship of Drivers, which was run to Formula Two regulations in 1952 and 1953. The race was held in Buenos Aires on 18 January 1953, at the Autódromo Gálvez (official name: Autódromo Juan y Óscar Gálvez, also known as the Autódromo 17 de Octubre) and was the first World Drivers' Championship race in South America.

Race report

The inaugural Argentine Grand Prix, held in mid-January, was attended by four of the major works teams: Maserati, Ferrari, Cooper, and Gordini. Former World Champion Juan Manuel Fangio, who had not competed in the Championship since clinching the 1951 title in Spain, raced for Maserati alongside fellow Argentinians José Froilán González and Oscar Alfredo Gálvez, and Italian driver Felice Bonetto. Ferrari lined up with the familiar trio of reigning World Champion Alberto Ascari, Nino Farina, and Luigi Villoresi, as well as their new signing Mike Hawthorn, who had driven a privateer Cooper the previous year. The Cooper team entered the British pair of Alan Brown and John Barber alongside the local driver Adolfo Schwelm Cruz. Gordini retained their 1952 trio of Robert Manzon, Maurice Trintignant, and Jean Behra, who were joined by a pair of Argentinians—Carlos Menditeguy and Pablo Birger—the latter of which drove a Simca-Gordini.

Ascari was once again the fastest qualifier, taking his fourth consecutive World Championship pole position. His teammates Villoresi and Farini lined up third and fourth, but the returning Fangio prevented a Ferrari front row lockout by qualifying second in his Maserati. González, in the second Maserati, started from row two alongside Hawthorn, making his first appearance for Ferrari, and the Gordini of Trintignant. The remaining Gordinis of Manzon, Menditeguy, and Behra made up the third row with Gálvez in his Maserati. Row four consisted of the Coopers of Brown and Schwelm Cruz, and Birger in the sole Simca-Gordini. At the back of the grid were the Maserati of Bonetto and Barber in the final Cooper.

Due to President Juan Perón's decision to allow free access to the circuit, there were an excessive number of spectators and they lined the track as the race began. One of the spectators wandered onto the track, and, in order to avoid hitting him, Nino Farina was forced to swerve. Farina ultimately lost control of his car and crashed into the crowd on lap 31, killing 13 spectators. In the resulting mass panic, a boy ran in front of Brown's Cooper and was killed.

Ascari, who started from pole, led the entirety of the race, taking his seventh consecutive World Championship race victory, and, in so doing, established an early lead in the Drivers' Championship. Fangio was in second until a transmission issue forced him to retire from the race. Manzon initially inherited the position, but Villoresi ultimately took second place, a lap behind his teammate. Hawthorn had been running in third, although he was eventually overtaken by González, preventing a Ferrari 1-2-3. Hawthorn finished fourth, ahead of Gálvez, who took the final points in his first and only World Championship race.

Entries

 — Maurice Trintignant qualified and drove 50 laps of the race in the #28 Gordini. Harry Schell took over the car for the remainder of the race.

Classification

Qualifying

Race

Notes
 – Includes 1 point for fastest lap

Shared drives
 Car #28: Maurice Trintignant (50 laps) and Harry Schell (41 laps).

Championship standings after the race 
Drivers' Championship standings

Note: Only the top five positions are included. Only the best 4 results counted towards the Championship.

References

Argentine Grand Prix
Argentine Grand Prix
Argentine Grand Prix
Argentine Grand Prix